Jodie Dry (born 20 January 1974) is an Australian actress.

Career 
She is known for her role as Nicole Brown, a former model and a former girlfriend of Joe Hill, in White Collar Blue; and as Biddy Marchant in ABC's Grassroots, having replaced Sophie Heathcote in the role. She also appeared in the 2001 Network 10  (13 episode)  television series, Sit Down, Shut Up, as well in [[All Saints (TV series)|All Saints]], Farscape, Stingers and Wildside.

In 2002, Jodie played Sally Diver in a telemovie titled Heroes Mountain'', based on the Thredbo disaster, which also starred Craig McLachlan as Stuart Diver.

Dry graduated from the National Institute of Dramatic Art in Australia.

References

External links  

1974 births
Living people
Australian television actresses
21st-century Australian actresses
Place of birth missing (living people)